Mount Dort is a conspicuous ice-free mountain,  high, projecting into the east side of Amundsen Glacier just south of the mouth of Cappellari Glacier. It was discovered and first mapped by the Byrd Antarctic Expedition, 1928–30, and named by the Advisory Committee on Antarctic Names for Wakefield Dort, Jr., a geologist at McMurdo Station, summer 1965–66, and exchange scientist at the Japanese Showa Station, winter 1967.

References 

Mountains of the Ross Dependency
Amundsen Coast